Samuel Odell (August 30, 1881July 3, 1946) was a Michigan politician.

Early life
Samuel Odell was born on August 30, 1881 in Shelby, Michigan to parents Samuel W. and Leila Delite Odell. Odell was of English descent.

Education
Odell attended University of Michigan from 1900 to 1902.

Career
Odell served two terms as supervisor of Shelby Township, Michigan. On November 3, 1908, Odell was elected to the Michigan House of Representatives where he represented the Oceana County district from January 6, 1909 to December 31, 1912. On November 5, 1912, Odell was elected to the Michigan Senate where he represented the 26th district from January 1, 1913 to December 31, 1916. In 1916, Odell was elected to the position of Michigan State Treasurer, and began serving in this capacity in 1917. On May 21, 1919, Odell resigned from this position to become a member of the Michigan Public Utilities Commission.

Personal life
Odell was unmarried during his time in the Michigan Legislature.

Death
Odell died on July 3, 1946 in Shelby, Michigan. He was interred at Oakhill Cemetery in Grand Rapids, Michigan.

References

1881 births
1946 deaths
People from Oceana County, Michigan
Burials in Michigan
University of Michigan alumni
Republican Party members of the Michigan House of Representatives
Republican Party Michigan state senators
State treasurers of Michigan
20th-century American politicians